Stilelibero (Freestyle) is the eighth studio album by Italian rock singer Eros Ramazzotti, released on October 30, 2000, on the BMG label.  The album, featuring three tracks produced by Trevor Horn and two by Rick Nowels, was recorded in a variety of locations in London, California and Italy.  Stilelibero was a commercial success, topping the Italian albums chart, as did the lead single, "Fuoco nel fuoco" also topping the singles chart.  "Più che puoi", a duet with Cher, also reached the Italian top 20.

Track listing

Stilelibero

Estilo libre

Charts

Sales and certifications

References

Eros Ramazzotti albums
2001 albums
Sony Music Netherlands albums
Albums produced by Rick Nowels
Albums produced by Trevor Horn